Sérgio Miguel Vieira Ribeiro (born 28 November 1980 in Matosinhos) is a Portuguese former cyclist.

Major results

2005
1st Stage 1 Vuelta a Castilla y León
3rd Overall Volta ao Alentejo
1st Stage 5
2006
1st Overall Volta ao Alentejo
1st Stage 5
1st Stage 1 Volta ao Distrito de Santarém
3rd Overall GP Internacional Paredes Rota dos Móveis
1st Stage 3
2009
1st Overall Tour do Brasil
1st Stages 2 & 3
1st Stage 3 GP Liberty Seguros
2010
1st Stage 5 Vuelta a Castilla y León
1st Stage 1 GP Liberty Seguros
 Volta a Portugal
1st Stages 2 & 8
2nd Overall Grande Prémio Crédito Agrícola de la Costa Azul
1st Stage 2
2011
1st Overall GP Liberty Seguros
 Volta a Portugal
1st Stages 1 & 2
2nd Overall Troféu Joaquim Agostinho
1st Stage 3
2012
1st Stage 3 GP Liberty Seguros
1st Stage 1 Troféu Joaquim Agostinho
1st Stage 5 Volta a Portugal
2013
1st Stage 1 Troféu Joaquim Agostinho

References

External links

1980 births
Living people
Portuguese male cyclists
Sportspeople from Matosinhos